Yvonne Gómez Muñoz (born December 19, 1966, in San Francisco, California) is a Spanish-American former competitive figure skater who competed internationally for both Spain and the United States. She represented Spain at the 1988 Winter Olympics and the 1988 and 1989 World Championships.

A member of the United States International Team (1983-1987), she represented the United States in two World University Games claiming the bronze medal at the 1987 Winter Universiade. She, along with her lifelong friend Brian Boitano, was coached by Linda Leaver and the three remain the best of friends to this day. Following her retirement from competitive skating, Yvonne skated professionally on the Brian Boitano and Katarina Witt Ice Skating Tour, USA and Canada (1990-1992) and had the role of Michaela in Horant H. Hohlfeld's Emmy winning HBO movie Carmen on Ice, 1990. She lives in San Francisco with her husband and two children.

Television
After retiring from professional skating, Yvonne spent the next decade carving out a career in television sport and entertainment programming. Mentored by renowned CBS sports director Bob Fishman, Yvonne became an Emmy nominated television director of network entertainment television specials and international figure skating competitions (NBC, CBS, ABC, ESPN, Turner, PBS, Lifetime), World figure skating championships and numerous television specials featuring Olympic figure skaters and musicians such as Seal, Barry Manilow, Ray Charles, Josh Groban, Burt Bacharach, Andrea Bocelli, Smokey Robinson, Demi Lavato, Wynona Judd, Gretchen Wilson, Sara Evans, Michael Bolton, Michael McDonald, OAR, Bella Thorne, Cody Simpson, Goo Goo Dolls, Backstreet Boys, Chicago, Jonas Brothers, Frankie Vali, Amy Grant, Chris Isaac, Celtic Woman, Earth Wind and Fire, Ashanti, Foreigner, Heart, Train, OAR, and Aretha Franklin.

She has earned two Daytime Emmy Directing nominations for Outstanding Directing in a Special Category (2003, 2008)

Mental Performance Coaching
While a successful television director, Yvonne returned to university and obtained a master's degree in Sport Psychology, an area of interest from her competitive figure skating days when she worked with Dr. Bruce Ogilvie, one of the pioneers of sports psychology in the United States. With a growing high performance consulting portfolio, she currently works with the  University of San Francisco Athletic Department (Men's Basketball, Baseball, Tennis, Cross Country, Track & Field, Golf, Soccer; Women's Basketball, Volleyball, Soccer, Golf, Cross Country, Track and Field), San Francisco Elite Soccer Academy, Spanish Olympic Figure Skating Federation, University of New Mexico Volleyball, and individual athletes on the Symmetra Golf Tour, European PGA, US International and National Figure Skating Team, Junior National Squash, Formula Russell car racing, Major League Soccer, United Soccer League and a host of aspiring youth athletes in multiple disciplines.

She also provides coaching workshops and executive presentations for national and multinational corporations such as Divon Academy, Make a Wish Foundation, and Accenture

Figure Skating Results

References

External links
 

American female single skaters
Spanish female single skaters
Olympic figure skaters of Spain
Figure skaters at the 1988 Winter Olympics
1966 births
Living people
Sportspeople from San Francisco
Universiade medalists in figure skating
Universiade bronze medalists for the United States
Competitors at the 1987 Winter Universiade
21st-century American women